The 1987–88 Toshiba Rugby Union County Championship was the 88th edition of England's County Championship rugby union club competition.

Lancashire won their 13th title after defeating Warwickshire in the final. 

The final only attracted 2,000 spectators at Twickenham Stadium which was blamed on the fact that the Grand National was taking place at the same time. However a more logical explanation was the introduction of the 1987–88 Courage League which provided the sport with its first official league table after replacing the former Merit table. Consequently clubs, players and fans now prioritised the Courage League over the County Championship.

Semi finals

Final

See also
 English rugby union system
 Rugby union in England

References

Rugby Union County Championship
County Championship (rugby union) seasons